Damian Angelo Hollis (born August 19, 1988) is a Hungarian professional basketball player who plays for Petro de Luanda. Born in the United States, he has represented Hungary in international competition.

Early life

Hollis was born in Fort Lauderdale, Florida. His father was a basketball player. When he was younger and started sports, basketball was the last sport he played. Damian started in soccer then baseball and he was better at those than he was basketball. Hollis started actually being good when he was around 14 years old, working with his father (Essie Hollis) who played in the NBA 1 year for the Detroit Pistons and 14 years in Europe. By the time Hollis got to high school, he already stopped playing soccer though it was his first love but his new decision was between baseball and basketball. Damian loved baseball because it was easier for him, but basketball was just more exciting, so Hollis decided to continue that in college.

College career

After a successful career in high school, Hollis wanted to keep playing basketball in college. His dream school was North Carolina in Chapel Hill. He got scholarship offers from about 100 division one and two school but North Carolina wasn't one of them. As time went on, Hollis assumed that they would never want him so he committed to George Washington University who was number 3 in the nation at the time. A few days later while he was in his Science class about to go to lunch the phone rang and it was a coach from North Carolina asking if he has committed to a college yet. They were ready to offer him a scholarship but he couldn't take it. Dame went into a depression over the next few weeks. He had to stay with his commitment despite this school being his dream come true.

Professional career
From 2010 to 2013, Hollis played with Hungarian club Albacomp. In the 2012–13 season, Hollis won the Hungarian Championship and the Hungarian Cup with Bericap Alba Fehérvár (the new name of Albacomp Fehérvár).

In August 2013, Hollis signed a one-year deal with Angelico Biella.

In July 2014, Hollis signed with Pallacanestro Cantù for the 2014–15 season. On March 23, 2015, he parted ways with Cantù and signed with Rethymno Aegean for the rest of the 2014–15 Greek Basket League season.

On August 5, 2015, Hollis signed with Basket Brescia Leonessa of the Italian Serie A2 Basket.

On July 24, 2016, Hollis joined Portuguese club S.L. Benfica in the Liga Portuguesa de Basquetebol.

On August 2, 2017, Hollis signed with Italian club Pallacanestro Varese for the 2017–18 season. On January 26, 2018, he parted ways with Varese after averaging 6.8 points per game in LBA. The same day, he signed with Bergamo for the rest of the 2017–18 Serie A2 Basket season. 

He signed with Benfica in July 2019. He averaged 10.2 points and 4.4 rebounds per game. On July 30, 2020, Hollis signed with Agribertocchi Orzinuovi of the Serie A2 Basket.

On January 4, 2022, Hollis signed with the Angolan club Petro de Luanda of the Angolan Basketball League and the Basketball Africa League (BAL).

National team career
Having previously represented the United States Under-19 national team in 2007, in the fall of 2012, Hollis became a dual citizen of Hungary in the hope of playing for the Hungary national basketball team.

Hungarian career statistics

Regular season

|-
| style="text-align:left;"| 2010–11
| style="text-align:left;"| Albacomp Fehérvár
| 26 || 15 || 27.3 || .510 || .360 || .827 || 6.3 || 1 || 1.7 || 0.3 || 13
|-
| style="text-align:left;"| 2011–12
| style="text-align:left;"| Albacomp Fehérvár
| 25 || 20 || 27.1 || .648 || .380 || .827 || 5.6 || 1.2 || 1.6 || 0.5 || 15.3
|-
| style="text-align:left;"| 2012–13
| style="text-align:left;"| Alba Fehérvár
| 21 || 21 || 28.0 || .626 || .375 || .860 || 5.6 || 1.5 || 1.7 || 0.3 || 13.0
|-class="unsortable"
| style="text-align:left;"| Career
| style="text-align:left;"| 
| 72 || 56 || 27.4 || .594 || .372 || .838 || 5.9 || 1.2 || 1.7 || 0.4 || 13.8

Pre-Playoffs

|-
| style="text-align:left;"| 2013
| style="text-align:left;"| Alba Fehérvár
| 10 || 8 || 24.6 || .508 || .296 || .733 || 5.8 || 1.1 || 1 || 0.5 || 11.2
|-class="unsortable"
| style="text-align:left;"| Career
| style="text-align:left;"| 
| 10 || 8 || 24.6 || .508 || .296 || .733 || 5.8 || 1.1 || 1 || 0.5 || 11.2

Playoffs

|-
| style="text-align:left;"| 2011
| style="text-align:left;"| Albacomp Fehérvár
| 10 || 2 || 24.1 || .609 || .347 || .833 || 6 || 1.2 || 1.2 || 1 || 11.7
|-
| style="text-align:left;"| 2012
| style="text-align:left;"| Albacomp Fehérvár
| 8 || 8 || 27.3 || .682 || .407 || .857 || 5 || 1.2 || 1.7 || 0.5 || 16.4
|-
| style="text-align:left;"| 2013
| style="text-align:left;"| Bericap Albacomp Fehérvár
| 14 || 14 || 30.6 || .538 || .405 || .769 || 6.6 || 1.6 || 1.9 || 0.6 || 14.8
|-class="unsortable"
| style="text-align:left;"| Career
| style="text-align:left;"| 
| || || ||  ||  || || || || || ||

Hungarian Cup

|-
| style="text-align:left;"| 2011
| style="text-align:left;"| Albacomp Fehérvár
| 6 || 6 || 28.5 || 0.533 || 0.312 || 0.818 || 6.3 || 1.2 || 1.5 || 0.3 || 12
|-
| style="text-align:left;"| 2012
| style="text-align:left;"| Albacomp Fehérvár
| 6 || 6 || 27.1 || 0.614 || 0.461 || 0.642 || 5.2 || 1.6 || 1.5 || 0.2 || 16.2
|-
| style="text-align:left;"| 2013
| style="text-align:left;"| Alba Fehérvár
| 6 || 6 || 26.8 || 0.615 || 0.524 || 0.950 || 5.3 || 1.2 || 1.2 || 0.7 || 16.7
|-class="unsortable"
| style="text-align:left;"| Career
| style="text-align:left;"| 
| 18 || 18 || || || || || || || || ||

Full career

|-
| style="text-align:left;"| 2010–11
| style="text-align:left;"| Albacomp Fehérvár
| 42 || 23 || 26.7 || .538 || .350 || .827 || 6.2 || 1 || 1.5 || 0.5 || 12.5
|-class=
| style="text-align:left;"| 2011–12
| style="text-align:left;"| Albacomp Fehérvár
| 39 || 34 || 27.2 || .652 || .397 || .824 || 5.4 || 1.2 || 1.7 || 0.4 || 15.6
|-class="unsortable"
| style="text-align:left;"| Total
| style="text-align:left;"| 
| 81 || 57 || 26.9 || .596 || .373 || .826 || 5.8 || 1.1 || 1.6 || 0.5 || 14

References

External links
 Damian Hollis - MKOSZ
 Damian Hollis' profile at albakosar.hu
 RealGMprofile
 EuroLeague profile

1988 births
Living people
African-American basketball players
Alba Fehérvár players
American expatriate basketball people in Belgium
American expatriate basketball people in Greece
American expatriate basketball people in Hungary
American expatriate basketball people in Italy
American expatriate basketball people in Portugal
Basketball players from Florida
Basket Brescia Leonessa players
George Washington Colonials men's basketball players
Lega Basket Serie A players
Pallacanestro Biella players
Pallacanestro Cantù players
Pallacanestro Varese players
Rethymno B.C. players
S.L. Benfica basketball players
Small forwards
Sportspeople from Fort Lauderdale, Florida
American men's basketball players
Atlético Petróleos de Luanda basketball players